The genus Cryptolaemus consists of predatory beetles of the family Coccinellidae, whose larvae and adults mostly prey upon scale insects on ornamental plants.

There are seven species in the genus, in two groups, all originally from eastern Australia, New Guinea and Indonesia.

Species
Cryptolaemus montrouzieri Mulsant, 1850
(plus six poorly known species)

References

Coccinellidae
Coccinellidae genera
Taxa named by Étienne Mulsant